James Zimmerman Logan (December 22, 1916 – March 27, 2004) was an American football guard who played one season with the Chicago Bears of the National Football League. He played college football at Indiana University Bloomington and attended Morton High School in Richmond, Indiana.

References

External links
Just Sports Stats

1916 births
2004 deaths
Players of American football from Indiana
American football guards
Indiana Hoosiers football players
Chicago Bears players
Sportspeople from Richmond, Indiana